Davichi in Wonderland is the first extended play by South Korean duo Davichi, released on February 27, 2009. A total of three music videos were released to the promote the album, with the M/Vs for "8282" and "Accident" being a 2-part drama music video starring Jung Chan-woo and Yoon Jung-hee. ("8282"is pronounced similarly as the Korean word "빨리빨리" which means "quickly".)

Promotions
At the beginning of February, Davichi's management announced they would be making a comeback after the successful debut of their first album. The lead single "8282" was met with great success and went on to become one of the duo's most successful releases to date. Additionally, the song "Is Love Funny" also charted well and reached a peak position of number three on KBS's Music Bank. There was a minor controversy surrounding the writer of the song "8282", with some people believing it plagiarized British singer Mika's "Happy Ending".

In April, the duo began their follow-up promotions with their song "My Man", which showcased their dancing skills.

Track listing

References

2009 EPs
Davichi albums